Into the Straight is a 1949 Australian horse racing melodrama directed by T. O. McCreadie.

Plot
The Curzons, an Australian horse racing family, are visited by an English horse trainer, Hugh Duncan, and his playboy son, Paul. Both men fall for June Curzon. However, after she is crippled in an accident Paul loses interest, and she realises she loves Hugh.

With Hugh's encouragement, June writes a piano concerto and learns to walk again. Her brother, the weak Sam Curzon, steals money from his father to pay gambling debts and allows Paul to take the blame. However, a horse secretly trained by Paul wins the Melbourne Cup.

Cast
James Workman as Hugh Duncan
Charles Tingwell as Sam Curzon
Margo Lee as Zara Marlowe
Muriel Steinbeck as Mrs Curzon
Nonnie Peifer as June Curzon
Shirley Hall as Bunty
George Randall as W.J. Curzon
Alan White as Paul Duncan

Production
Charles Tingwell also worked as a trainee to Alex Ezard.

Shooting began in June 1948, on location in Scone, New South Wales, and at the studio of Commonwealth Film Laboratories in Sydney. The Victoria Racing Club allowed a re-creation of the Melbourne Cup to be shot at Flemington Racecourse and scenes were also filmed at Randwick Racecourse. Several jockeys made cameos in the film, including Jack Purtell and George Moore.

The film featured a piano concerto which took up several minutes of screen time.

Reception
The film was well received in Perth but only had a short run in Sydney and Melbourne.

Filmink later wrote "Steinbeck was the biggest name in the cast at the time, but it isn’t much of a role… and in hindsight that was a mistake. The filmmakers would have been better off building the movie around Steinbeck – either have her play the role of her daughter... or made her character the center of the action. But then, Australian cinema has traditionally demonstrated a poor understanding how best to exploit potential stars."

References

External links
 
 Into the Straight at Australian Screen Online
Into the Straight at Oz Movies
Review at Variety

1949 films
Australian drama films
Australian horse racing films
1949 drama films
Australian black-and-white films
1940s Australian films
1940s English-language films